Valdivia may refer to:

Places

Chile 
 Valdivia, a city and municipality in the Province of Valdivia
 Valdivia River, a river which begins in the city of Valdivia
 Valdivia Province, the Province of Valdivia
 Valdivian Coastal Range, part of the bigger Chilean Coastal Range
 Valdivian Coastal Reserve, a natural reserve south of the city of Valdivia
 Valdivia National Reserve, a natural reserve south of the city of Valdivia
 Roman Catholic Diocese of Valdivia
 , a minor town in O'Higgins Region
 Valdivia Volcano, an old name for Mocho-Choshuenco 
 Valdivia Lake, an old name for Llanquihue Lake
 Valdivia Fracture Zone, a geological fracture zone in Nazca Plate

Colombia 
 Valdivia, Antioquia, a municipality in Antioquia Department, Colombia
 Valdivia Department, former department in Antioquia State

Ecuador 
 Valdivia, Ecuador, a minor town in Guayas Province

Spain 
 Valdivia, Badajoz, a minor town near Badajoz in Extremadura

The Sub-Antarctic 
Cape Valdivia, on Bouvetøya

Antarctica 
 Valdivia Point

Red Sea 
 Valdivia Deep

Culture

Ecuador 
 Valdivia culture

Chile 
 Valdivia International Film Festival
 Deportes Valdivia

People
 Pedro de Valdivia (1497–1553), first royal governor of Chile and founder of several cities in the country, including that bearing his name
 Jorge Valdivia (born 1983), Chilean football player currently playing for Colo-Colo
 Pierrick Valdivia (born 1988), French football player, former of Olympique Lyonnais, currently playing for Guingamp
 Luis de Valdivia (1560–1642), Spanish jesuit that advocated for a defensive war during the Arauco War
 Javier Valdivia (born 1941), former Mexican footballer
 Jose Valdivia, Jr., a Peruvian jockey
 Noelle Valdivia, American playwright
 Julio César Valdivia (born 1982), Mexican football goalkeeper
 Alberto Valdivia Baselli (born 1977), Peruvian poet
 Rey Alejandro Conde Valdivia, Mexican conductor
 Juan Valdivia (born 1965), guitarist in Spanish rock band Héroes del Silencio
 Wanderson Ferreira de Oliveira known as Valdívia (born 1994), Brazilian footballer

Other
 Valdivian temperate rain forests, a temperate broad-leaf and mixed forest ecoregion located on the west coast of southern South America
 Valdivia, the name for the Eemian interglacial period, around 130,000–114,000 years ago, in Chile
 Valdivian Fort System, colonial fortifications made to protect the city of Valdivia (The key of the South seas, Gibraltar of the Pacific) 
 Valdivia (plant), a genus in the family Escalloniaceae
 Valdivia (crab), a genus in the family Trichodactylidae
 Valdivia (moth), a former genus in the family Pyralidae
 Flag of Valdivia, the flag of the city of Valdivia
 Capture of Valdivia, a battle in the Chilean War of Independence
 Pedro de Valdivia Avenue, a street in Santiago, Chile
 Pedro de Valdivia metro station
 Pedro de Valdivia Bridge, a bridge in Valdivia, Chile
 2741 Valdivia, an asteroid
 Chilean landing ship Valdivia (LST-93), a landing ship tank vessel acquired from the United States in 1995 and decommissioned in 2011
 Valdivia Expedition, German Deep Sea Expedition of 1898-99.